The Pattern Makers' League of North America (PMLNA) was a labor union representing patternmakers in the United States and Canada.

History
The union was founded on May 18, 1887 in Philadelphia, as the Pattern Makers' National League of North America.  It was chartered by the American Federation of Labor in 1894, and adopted its long-term name in 1898.  By 1925, the union had 8,985 members.

In 1955, the union transferred to the new AFL-CIO, and by 1957, it had 15,000 members.  However, membership in 1980 had fallen to only 9,600.  On October 1, 1991, it merged into the International Association of Machinists.

Presidents
1887: T. J. McGonnell
1892: Louis Kirberg
1894: Lewis R. Thomas
1902: James Wilson
1934: George Q. Lynch
1960: Gunnar Hallstrom
1972: Charles Romelfanger
1984: Jack L. Gabelhausen, Sr.

References

See also
Pattern Makers League of North America v NLRB

Engineering trade unions
Trade unions established in 1887
Trade unions disestablished in 1991